Mihai Ghimpu (born 19 November 1951) is a Moldovan politician who served as Speaker of Parliament and Acting President of Moldova from 2009 to 2010. He was member of Parliament of Moldova from 1990 to 1998 and from 2009 to 2019. Ghimpu held the position of leader of Liberal Party (PL) from 1998 to 2018.

Family
Mihai Ghimpu was born on 19 November 1951 in the village of Colonița, Chișinău, Moldavian SSR. His mother, Irina Ursu (daughter of Haralambie Ursu) died in 2003; she worked at the local kolkhoz. His father, Toader Ghimpu (deceased in 1980), was an elementary school teacher only a few years because he completed only seven years of schooling during the Romanian rule, then he worked at the local kolkhoz too. Mihai Ghimpu is the youngest brother of Gheorghe Ghimpu, Simion Ghimpu, Visarion, and Valentina (mother of Dorin Chirtoacă). He has been married, for more than 30 years, to Dina Ghimpu, an employee of Moldova's Culture Ministry; they have no children.

Education and early career
After attending elementary school in his hometown, Mihai Ghimpu enrolled in School no.1 of Chișinău (now "Gheorghe Asachi" High School). After high school, he carried out the compulsory military service in the Soviet army until 1972. Then, Ghimpu studied law at Moldova State University (1974–1978), after which worked as legal counsel to state enterprises. In 1978–1990 years he worked as a lawyer, headed the legal departments of various companies and served as a judge in Sectorul Rîșcani of Chișinău.

In the late 1980s Ghimpu joined the democratic movement. He was one of the founders of the Popular Front of Moldova, a member of the executive committee of the movement, known as one of the leading political forces in Moldova. In 1990 polls, Mihai Ghimpu was elected to Moldovan Parliament as a representative of Popular Front and in 1994 polls as a representative of the Bloc of the Intellectuals. Alongside parliament members, Ghimpu voted the Declaration of Independence of Moldova in 1991.

In 1997 Mihai Ghimpu was elected as chairman of the Party of Reform, created by Anatol Șalaru in 1993. In 1998 polls, the party obtained only 0.54% and failed to pass the electoral threshold of 4%. The Party of Reform didn't participate in 2001 polls and 2005 polls.

In April 2005, the party changed its name and became known as the Liberal Party of Moldova (PL). In 2007, Mihai Ghimpu was elected as alderman in Chișinău Municipal Council. Two weeks later, the vice-president of the Liberal Party, Dorin Chirtoacă won a victory over the Communist Veaceslav Iordan and became mayor of Chișinău. The Liberal Party obtained 13.13% of the votes in April 2009 polls, equating to 15 out of 101 MPs; Ghimpu was one of the party's MPs and in the July 2009 polls, he was re-elected.

According to last polls made in 2019 referring to the most popular politicians of the Republic of Moldova, Mihai Ghimpu is on the fifteenth position among the top of politicians in which Moldovans have the highest trust, and the others are on the eleventh position

Timeline

 1988—1993: Founder of the democratic movement the Popular Front of Moldova, member of the Executive Office
 1990—1998: Member of Parliament of the Republic of Moldova, Vice Chairman of Legal Committee
 1993—1998: The Congress of Intellectuals, Executive Secretary, Vice President
 1998–present: Chairman of the Liberal Party (PL)
 2007—2009: alderman in Chișinau Municipal Council
 2007—2008: Chairman of the Chișinau Municipal Council
 28 August 2009: Elected as Speaker of the Moldovan Parliament
 11 September 2009—28 December 2010: interim President of the Republic of Moldova.

Alliance For European Integration

In July 2009 were held early parliamentary elections for the XVIII convocation. The Moldovan Communist Party (PCRM) won the elections with 44.76 per cent of votes. In the parliament entered four other parties - the Liberal Democratic Party of Moldova (16.55 percent), Liberal Party (14.61 percent), Democratic Party of Moldova (12.55 percent) and the Party Alliance Our Moldova (7.35 percent of the vote). As a result, the Communists gained 48 seats in Parliament (out of 101), the Liberal Democrats - 18, Liberals - 15, ASM - 7, the Democrats - 13.

The leader of Liberal Party (PL), Mihai Ghimpu, as well as leaders of the Liberal Democratic Party of Moldova (PLDM), Vlad Filat, Democratic Party of Moldova (PDM), Marian Lupu and the Party Alliance Our Moldova (AMN) Serafim Urechean more than a week held talks on forming a coalition, and in August 2009 the party established a governing coalition under the banner "Alliance For European Integration".

President of the Moldovan Parliament

On 28 August 2009, Mihai Ghimpu was elected as the Speaker of the Moldovan Parliament, through secret voting, getting all 53 votes of the Alliance For European Integration.

Mihai Ghimpu on 28 August 2009: "I thank my colleagues for their trust. I hope that while in this post I will cooperate for a free press, independent legal system, and a state of law of which all the Moldovan citizens will be proud."

Speaking at the World Conference of Speakers of Parliament in Geneva on 20 July 2010, Ghimpu said: "Why have we become the poorest country in Europe? Not only because we did not carry out democratic reforms at the right time, but also because today on the territory of Moldova, part of an occupation army and its equipment continue to be stationed."

President of Moldova

On 11 September 2009, he became the acting president of Moldova. The interim position was possible following the resignation of Moldovan President, Vladimir Voronin, announced in the morning of 11 September 2009 on the public broadcaster Moldova 1. The resignation letter was sent to the Parliament secretariat and by a vote of 52 deputies in the plenary session of the legislature the post of the President of the Republic of Moldova was declared vacant. Therefore, in accordance with Article 91 of the Constitution of 1994, which provides that "the responsibility of the office shall devolve ad interim to the President of Parliament or the Prime Minister, in that order of priority", Mihai Ghimpu has become the interim President of the Republic of Moldova until a new president is elected by the Parliament.

The Commission for constitutional reform in Moldova was set up under presidential decree on 1 December 2009 in order to resolve the constitutional crisis. On 14 January 2010 Ghimpu decreed to set up a Commission for the Study of the Communist Dictatorship in Moldova, aimed at studying the responsibilities of Soviet rule in the former Moldavian SSR.

In June 2010, Ghimpu decreed a Soviet Occupation Day. The decree that was promptly cancelled by the Constitutional Court on 12 July 2010. He also unveiled the commemorative stone to the victims of totalitarianism.

Ghimpu has been awarded the Order of the Star of Romania, 1st Class (Collar).

Ethnic identity

Mihai Ghimpu is known as an unambiguous supporter of the common Romanian-Moldovan ethnic identity:

See also
Liberal Party (Moldova)
Liberalism
Parliament of the Republic of Moldova
President of Moldova
Acting President of Moldova

Notes

|-

1951 births
People from Colonița
Romanian people of Moldovan descent
Acting presidents of Moldova
Liberal Party (Moldova) MPs
Moldovan MPs 2014–2018
Living people
Members of the parliament of Moldova
Moldova State University alumni
Moldovan jurists
Moldovan MPs 1990–1994
Moldovan MPs 1994–1998
Moldovan MPs 2009
Moldovan MPs 2009–2010
Politicians from Chișinău
Presidents of the Moldovan Parliament
Popular Front of Moldova MPs
First Class of the Order of the Star of Romania